Jambeiro is a municipality in the state of São Paulo in Brazil. It is part of the Metropolitan Region of Vale do Paraíba e Litoral Norte. The population is 6,717 (2020 est.) in an area of 184.41 km². The elevation is 695 m.

The municipality contains part of the  Mananciais do Rio Paraíba do Sul Environmental Protection Area, created in 1982 to protect the sources of the Paraíba do Sul river.

References

External links
Page About Jambeiro City

Municipalities in São Paulo (state)